The doctrine of nondelegation (or non-delegation principle) is the theory that one branch of government must not authorize another entity to exercise the power or function which it is constitutionally authorized to exercise itself. It is explicit or implicit in all written constitutions that impose a strict structural separation of powers. It is usually applied in questions of constitutionally improper delegations of powers of any of the three branches of government to either of the other, to the administrative state, or to private entities. Although it is usually constitutional for executive officials to delegate executive powers to executive branch subordinates, there can also be improper delegations of powers within an executive branch.

In the United Kingdom, the non-delegation principle refers to the prima facie presumption that statutory powers granted to public bodies by Parliament can not be delegated to other people or bodies.

Australia

Australian federalism does not permit the federal Parliament or Government to delegate its powers to state or territorial parliaments or governments, nor territorial parliaments or governments to delegate their powers to the federal Parliament or Government, but the states parliaments delegate its powers to the federal parliament by means of section 51 subsection (xxxvii) of the Constitution Act 1901.

Canada

Canadian federalism does not permit Parliament or the provincial legislatures to delegate their powers to each other. See: Attorney General of Nova Scotia v. Attorney General of Canada, [1951] S.C.R. 31

United States

In the Federal Government of the United States, the nondelegation doctrine is the theory that the Congress of the United States, being vested with "all legislative powers" by Article One, Section 1 of the United States Constitution, cannot delegate that power to anyone else. The scope of this restriction has been the subject of dispute. The Supreme Court ruled in J. W. Hampton, Jr. & Co. v. United States (1928) that congressional delegation of legislative authority is an implied power of Congress that is constitutional so long as Congress provides an "intelligible principle" to guide the executive branch: In determining what Congress may do in seeking assistance from another branch, the extent and character of that assistance must be fixed according to common sense and the inherent necessities of the government co-ordination.' So long as Congress 'shall lay down by legislative act an intelligible principle to which the person or body authorized to [exercise the delegated authority] is directed to conform, such legislative action is not a forbidden delegation of legislative power. Posner and Vermeule in 2002 further argued that the restriction is only that the legislature cannot delegate the authority to vote on legislation or execute other de jure powers of the legislature. Further, they argue that the grant of power to the executive branch is never a transfer of legislative power but rather an exercise of legislative power.

For example, the Food and Drug Administration (FDA) is an agency in the executive branch created by Congress with the power to regulate food and drugs in the United States. Congress has given the FDA a broad mandate to ensure the safety of the public and prevent false advertising, but it is up to the agency to assess risks and announce prohibitions on harmful additives, and to determine the process by which actions will be brought based on the same. Similarly, the Internal Revenue Service has been given the responsibility of collecting taxes that are assessed under the Internal Revenue Code. Although Congress has determined the amount of the tax to be assessed, it has delegated to the IRS the authority to determine how such taxes are to be collected. The nondelegation doctrine has been used in such cases to argue against the constitutionality of expanding bureaucratic power. Some scholars argue the nondelegation doctrine has proven popular in state courts, but with two exceptions in 1935, legal scholars argue that the doctrine is not evident in federal courts. This trend began to reverse due to the views of Chief Justice John Roberts, who joined Justice Gorsuch's dissenting opinion in Gundy v United States. In Gundy, the Court upheld a provision of the Sex Offender Registration and Notification Act, authorizing the attorney general “to prescribe rules” concerning offenders who would have to register as sex offenders. However, Gorsuch argued that the statutory provision violated the nondelegation doctrine because it was not one of three exceptions to the nondelegation doctrine.

Case law

Pre-1935 
The origins of the nondelegation doctrine, as interpreted in U.S., can be traced back to, at least, 1690, when John Locke wrote:
<blockquote>
The Legislative cannot transfer the Power of Making Laws to any other hands. For it being but a delegated Power from the People, they, who have it, cannot pass it over to others. ... And when the people have said, We will submit to rules, and be govern'd by Laws made by such Men, and in such Forms, no Body else can say other Men shall make Laws for them; nor can the people be bound by any Laws but such as are Enacted by those, whom they have Chosen, and Authorised to make Laws for them. The power of the Legislative being derived from the People by a positive voluntary Grant and Institution, can be no other, than what the positive Grant conveyed, which being only to make Laws, and not to make Legislators, the Legislative can have no power to transfer their Authority of making laws, and place it in other hands. the Court stated that:

The Supreme Court has never found a violation of the nondelegation doctrine outside of Panama Refining and Schechter Poultry in 1935. Exemplifying the Court's legal reasoning on this matter, it ruled in the 1998 case Clinton v. City of New York that the Line Item Veto Act of 1996, which authorized the President to selectively void portions of appropriation bills, was a violation of the Presentment Clause, which sets forth the formalities governing the passage of legislation. Although the Court noted that the attorneys prosecuting the case had extensively discussed the nondelegation doctrine, the Court declined to consider that question. However, Justice Kennedy, in a concurring opinion, wrote that he would have found the statute to violate the exclusive responsibility for laws to be made by Congress.

Important cases 
 Cargo of the Brig Aurora v. United States, 
 Wayman v. Southard, 
 Field v. Clark, 
 Buttfield v. Stranahan, 
 United States v. Grimaud, 
 Mahler v. Eby, 
 J. W. Hampton, Jr. & Co. v. United States, 
 Panama Refining Co. v. Ryan, 
 A.L.A. Schechter Poultry Corp. v. United States, 
 Carter v. Carter Coal Co., 
 United States v. Curtiss-Wright Export Corp., 
 Currin v. Wallace, 
 Sunshine Anthracite Coal Co. v. Adkins, 
 OPP Cotton Mills, Inc. v. Administrator of Wage and Hour Div., Dept. of Labor, 
 National Broadcasting Co. v. United States, 
 Yakus v. United States, 
 Federal Energy Administration v. Algonquin SNG, Inc., 
 Industrial Union Department v. American Petroleum Institute, 
 American Textile Mfrs. Inst., Inc. v. Donovan, 
 Mistretta v. United States, 
 Skinner v. Mid-America Pipeline Co., 
 Touby v. United States, 
 Metropolitan Washington Airports Authority v. Citizens for Abatement of Aircraft Noise, Inc., 
 Loving v. United States, 
 Clinton v. City of New York, 
 Whitman v. American Trucking Ass'ns, Inc., 
 Department of Transportation v. Association of American Railroads, 
 Coventry Health Care of Mo., Inc. v. Nevils, 
 Gundy v. United States, 
 Paul v. United States,  
 Jarkesy v. SEC, No. 20-6100, __ F.4th __ (5th Cir. 2022)

Major questions doctrine 

The major questions doctrine is a rough analogue to the nondelegation doctrine. It says that when a government agency seeks to decide an issue of "vast economic or political significance," a vague or general delegation of authority from Congress is not enough. Rather, the agency must have clear statutory authorization to decide the issue.

The major questions doctrine serves as an exception to the Chevron doctrine, which ordinarily requires courts to defer to an agency's interpretation of a statute it enforces, so long as the statute is ambiguous and the agency's interpretation is reasonable. However, it goes further than just negating deference to the agency. Even if the most reasonable interpretation of the statute allows the agency to take an action, it will not be enough unless that delegation of authority is clearly stated.

In explaining the major questions doctrine in UARG v. EPA (2014), the Supreme Court explained that "We expect Congress to speak clearly if it wishes to assign to an agency decisions of vast 'economic and political significance.'" Similarly, in Whitman v. American Trucking Associations (2001), the Court stated that Congress "does not alter the fundamental details of a regulatory scheme in vague terms or ancillary provisions—it does not, one might say, hide elephants in mouseholes.”

The Supreme Court first explicitly embraced the phrase "major questions doctrine" in West Virginia v. Environmental Protection Agency (2022), the decision which held that the EPA's Clean Power Plan, requiring energy producers to shift from fossil fuels to renewable sources, was not authorized by the Clean Air Act.

With the Inflation Reduction Act of 2022, some commentators argued that Congress overruled the Court by clarifying that carbon dioxide is one of the pollutants covered by the 1970 Clean Air Act. However, the Supreme Court had already held that greenhouse gasses are pollutants in Massachusetts v. EPA (2007), and the Supreme Court did not overrule that holding in West Virginia v. EPA.

Important cases 
 MCI Telecommunications Corp. v. American Telephone & Telegraph Co., 
 FDA v. Brown & Williamson Tobacco Corp., 
 Gonzales v. Oregon, 
 Utility Air Regulatory Group v. Environmental Protection Agency, 
 King v. Burwell, 
 Michigan v. EPA, 
 Gundy v. United States, 
 Paul v. United States,  
 Alabama Assn. of Realtors v. Department of Health and Human Servs., 
 Biden v. Missouri, 
 National Federation of Independent Business v. Department of Labor, Occupational Safety and Health Administration, 
 West Virginia v. EPA, 
 Biden v. Nebraska,

United Kingdom 
In general, powers granted by Parliament are presumed to only be exercisable by the body which is given those powers and can not be delegated. This is known as the "non-delegation principle" or the "presumption against delegation".

For example, in Barnard v National Dock Labour Board [1953] 2 QB 18, the Court of Appeal held that the delegation of disciplinary powers originally granted to the London Dock Labour Board to the port manager was unlawful. In his judgment, Lord Denning argued that the power of suspension was a judicial function. The dock labour board had to receive reports from employers and investigate them, they had to inquire whether the accused was guilty of misconduct, and they had to decide the appropriate disciplinary action to take. And as "[n]o judicial tribunal can delegate its functions unless it is enabled to do so expressly or by necessary implication", the delegation of the disciplinary powers was held to be unlawful.

Exceptions to the non-delegation principle

Consultation as opposed to delegation 
English courts have made a distinction between seeking consultation and the delegation of powers, the former of which is deemed to be permissible as decision making does not happen within an "institutional bubble". The important factor in deciding whether a public body is seeking consultation or whether they have delegated those powers is examining whether the powers are ultimately at the hands of the decision-maker in practice, as opposed to de jure.

In R (New London College) v Secretary of State for the Home Department [2013] UKSC 51, the Supreme Court held that the Home Secretary did not unlawfully delegate her powers to control entry into the UK to sponsoring institutions. Immigration rules dictated that all student visa applicants had to produce a "Confirmation of Studies" (CAS) which is produced by sponsoring institutions like universities. As part of the application process, institutions must make judgements whether they had an intention to study there. The Supreme Court rejected arguments that this was tantamount to the delegation of powers to sponsoring institutions. Lord Sumption, in his judgment, noted that "a significant number of Tier 4 (General) migrants with a CAS are in fact refused leave to enter or remain on these grounds". This, according to the Supreme Court, showed that the Home Secretary de facto exercised powers of final decision and therefore was merely consulting sponsoring institutions, not delegating her powers.

The Carltona doctrine 

The Carltona doctrine (or Carltona principle) is the idea that when powers are granted to departmental officials, they can be lawfully delegated to their civil servants.

See also
 Whitman v. American Trucking Associations, Inc.
 Amalgamated Meat Cutters v. Connally
 Chevron deference
 INS v. Chadha (1983)

References

External links
 "The Role of Congress in Monitoring Administrative Rulemaking" − Testimony of Jerry Taylor, Cato Institute, before the Subcommittee on Commercial and Administrative Law, Committee on the Judiciary, September 12, 1996. 
 "The Delegation Doctrine", Madelon Lief, Wisconsin Legislative Reference Bureau, January 2004, Vol. IV, No. 1. 
 "The Recent Controversy Over the Non Delegation Doctrine", Jeffrey Clark, 2001. 
 "Hot Oil and Hot Air: The Development of the Nondelegation Doctrine through the New Deal, a History 1813-1944," Andrew J. Ziaja, 35 Hastings Const. L.Q. 921 (2008). 

United States administrative law
United States constitutional law
Theories of constitutional interpretation
Legal doctrines and principles